The Best of Aretha Franklin is a 1973 compilation by Aretha Franklin. It contains alternate takes and is one of only a few quadraphonic releases. It was reissued on DVD-Audio by Rhino Handmade in August 2010. It is not to be confused with a 1984 compilation of the same name.

Track listing
"Respect" - 2:24
"Baby, I Love You" - 2:46
"Chain of Fools" - 4:22
an alternate version exclusive to this compilation
"Rock Steady" - 4:19
contains an alternate introduction exclusive to this compilation
"Spanish Harlem" - 3:40
"Don't Play That Song" - 2:48
"Dr. Feelgood" - 3:18
"Day Dreaming" - 3:49
"I Say A Little Prayer" - 3:22
"(You Make Me Feel Like) A Natural Woman" - 2:43
"Call Me" - 3:24
"Bridge over Troubled Water" - 5:30

References

1973 greatest hits albums
Aretha Franklin compilation albums
Atlantic Records compilation albums